Uvis is a Latvian masculine given name. People bearing the name include:
Uvis Jānis Balinskis (born 1996), ice hockey player 
Uvis Helmanis (born 1972), basketball player
Uvis Kalniņš (born 1993), swimmer
Uvis Stazdiņš (born 1999), handball player

References

Latvian masculine given names